Frederich William Schlueter (April 16, 1895 – November 20, 1969) was a member of the Wisconsin State Assembly.

Biography
Schlueter was born on April 16, 1895, in Berlin, Wisconsin. He attended the University of Wisconsin-Madison. He died of a heart attack on November 20, 1969, while at a hunting camp near Grand Marsh, Wisconsin.

Career
Schlueter was a member of the Assembly from 1955 to 1964. Previously, he had been clerk of the Town of Ripon, Wisconsin. He was a Republican.

References

External links

People from Berlin, Wisconsin
People from Fond du Lac County, Wisconsin
University of Wisconsin–Madison alumni
1895 births
1969 deaths
20th-century American politicians
Republican Party members of the Wisconsin State Assembly